The Allan Cup Hockey West (ACHW) (formerly the Chinook League) is a multi-tier Canadian Senior ice hockey league based in Alberta, on hiatus as of 2021. The ACHW is one of two Allan Cup-eligible ice hockey leagues currently operating in Canada; the other is Ontario's Allan Cup Hockey. Since the beginning of the 1998–99 season, the Chinook and ACHW have produced four Allan Cup national champions: the 1999 Stony Plain Eagles, and the 2009, 2013 and 2016 Bentley Generals.  The Lacombe Generals have the most playoff championship wins at 12.  Stony Plain collected eight consecutive titles from 1998 to 2005 while the Generals recently earned their 11th consecutive title dating back to 2008–2009.

History
Founded as the Chinook Hockey League in 1955.

In 2013, the Chinook Hockey League hired George Vanberg as their league president.  Prior to Vanberg, Ray Marsh was league president for over 35 years.

In June 2016, the Chinook Hockey League elected Jerry Muise as their league president. He was vice president since 2013.

The league was renamed Allan Cup Hockey West prior to the 2017–2018 season. In November 2018, the Fort Saskatchewan Chiefs suspended operations, leaving the league with four teams.  Rosetown and Lacombe left the league prior to the 2019–20 season, making Allan Cup Hockey West a two-team league.

The 2019-20 playoffs, and the 2020–21 season, were cancelled due to COVID-19.  The Innisfail Eagles left the league before the 2021–22 season, effectively ending Senior AAA hockey in Alberta.

Former teams

Alix Warriors
Bashaw Stars
Beaumont Warriors
Bentley Generals
Big Valley Oil Kings
Bowness Royals (Calgary)
Carstairs Colts
Carstairs Redhawks
Didsbury Ramblers
Drayton Valley Wildcats
Drumheller Miners
Eckville Eagles
Enoch Falcons
Fort McMurray Millionaires
Fort Saskatchewan Chiefs
Hobbema Oilers
Innisfail Aces
Innisfail Eagles
Innisfail Oilers
Lacombe Generals
Lacombe Purity 99ers
Lacombe Merchants
Lloydminster Border Kings
Millet Thunder
Montgomery V's (Calgary) 
Okotoks Drillers
Okotoks Oilers (senior team)
Olds B's
Olds Elks
Penhold RCAF Wings
Paul Band Black Hawks
Ponoka Stampeders (senior team)
Ponoka Superiors
Red Deer Border Pavers
Red Deer Roadrunners
Red Deer Gunners
Red Deer Monarchs
Red Deer Juniors
Red Deer Burnt Lakers
Rocky Rams
Rosetown Red Wings
River Cree Warriors
Stettler Imperials
Stettler Sabres
Trochu Arenas
Trochu Blazers
Stony Plain Eagles
Sylvan Lake Admirals
West Central Alberta Rams
Westlock Wolfpack
Wetaskiwin Thunder

Champions

1969 Didsbury Ramblers
1970 Rocky Rams
1971 Didsbury Ramblers
1972 Innisfail Eagles
1973 Okotoks Oilers
1974 Olds Elks
1975 Red Deer Roadrunners
1976 Olds Elks
1977 Olds Elks
1978 Red Deer Border Pavers
1979 Innisfail Eagles
1980 Innisfail Eagles
1981 Innisfail Eagles
1982 Lacombe Merchants
1983 Innisfail Eagles
1984 Innisfail Eagles
1985 Innisfail Eagles
1986 Stettler Sabres
1987 Eckville Eagles
1988 Ponoka Stampeders
1989 Paul Band Black Hawks
1990  No winner decided.
Paul Band competed in the Hardy Cup with the final never played between Paul Band and Stony Plain.
1991 Paul Band Black Hawks
1992 Olds Elks
1993 Innisfail Eagles
1994 Bashaw Stars
1995 Millet Thunder
1996 Stony Plain Eagles
1997 Millet Thunder
1998 Stony Plain Eagles
1999 Stony Plain Eagles
2000 Stony Plain Eagles
2001 Stony Plain Eagles
2002 Stony Plain Eagles
2003 Stony Plain Eagles
2004 Stony Plain Eagles
2005 Stony Plain Eagles
2006 Fort Hotel Chiefs
2007 Bentley Generals
2008 Stony Plain Eagles
2009 Bentley Generals
2010 Bentley Generals
2011 Bentley Generals 
2012 Bentley Generals 
2013 Bentley Generals 
2014 Bentley Generals 
2015 Bentley Generals 
2016 Bentley Generals 
2017 Lacombe Generals
2018 Lacombe Generals
2019 Lacombe Generals
2020 playoffs cancelled
2021 season cancelled

See also
Allan Cup
Hardy Cup

References

External links
Official website

1968 establishments in Alberta
Sports leagues established in 1968
Senior ice hockey